Christian Maghoma (born 8 November 1997) is a Congolese professional footballer who plays as a centre back for National League club Eastleigh.

Club career

Tottenham Hotspur
Maghoma signed for Tottenham Hotspur in July 2014 and went on loan in 2015 to Yeovil Town in the EFL League Two however he did not make any competitive appearances. He was released from his contract at the end of the 2017–18 season.

Arka Gdynia
On 18 June 2018 Maghoma was signed by Polish club Arka Gdynia on a three-year deal. Maghoma made his debut for the club coming in the 60th minute in the 2018 Polish Super Cup where Arka Gdynia beat Legia Warsaw 3–2.

Gillingham
On 26 August 2020, Maghoma signed for Gillingham on a permanent contract.

On 20 August 2021, Maghoma joined National League side Eastleigh on loan until January 2022.

Following relegation to League Two, Maghoma was released at the end of the 2021–22 season.

Eastleigh
On 16 June 2022, Maghoma was announced to be returning to Eastleigh on a permanent basis upon the expiration of his contract with Gillingham.

International career
Maghoma made one appearance for the England national under-16 football team in a victory over Northern Ireland U16s for the 2012 Victory Shield on 27 September 2012.

Maghoma was called up to the DR Congo national football team in May 2017. Maghoma made his debut for DR Congo in a 2–0 friendly win over Botswana on 5 June 2017.

Personal life
Maghoma was born in Lubumbashi, DR Congo and brought up in London, where he attended Finchley Catholic High School in North Finchley. Christian is the younger brother of the footballer Jacques Maghoma who came through the ranks of Tottenham Hotspur academy, and is the older brother of Paris Maghoma who plays for Brentford.

Career statistics

Honours
Arka Gdynia
Polish SuperCup: 2018

References

External links
 Tottenham Hotspur Profile
 
 ESPN Profile

1997 births
Living people
People from Lubumbashi
Democratic Republic of the Congo footballers
Democratic Republic of the Congo international footballers
English footballers
England youth international footballers
Democratic Republic of the Congo emigrants to England
Tottenham Hotspur F.C. players
Yeovil Town F.C. players
Arka Gdynia players
Gillingham F.C. players
Eastleigh F.C. players
Ekstraklasa players
English Football League players
National League (English football) players
Democratic Republic of the Congo expatriate footballers
Democratic Republic of the Congo expatriates in Poland
English expatriate footballers
English expatriates in Poland
Expatriate footballers in Poland
Association football defenders